Pseudopachylaelaps is a genus of mites in the family Leptolaelapidae. There is at least one described species in Pseudopachylaelaps, P. ornatus.

References

Mesostigmata
Articles created by Qbugbot